Robert Vaden is the name of:

 Robert C. Vaden (1882–1954), American businessman and state senator
 Robert Vaden (basketball) (born 1985), American basketball player